Route 330 is a collector road in the Canadian province of Nova Scotia.

It is located in Shelburne County and connects Barrington Passage at Trunk 3 with Clark's Harbour.

It crosses the Barrington Passage to Cape Sable Island on a causeway that opened in 1949, replacing a ferry service.

Communities
Lower Clarks Harbour
Clark's Harbour
Centreville
Barrington Passage

History

The entirety of Collector Highway 330 was once designated as Trunk Highway 30. This is not to be confused with the current alignment of the Trunk 30, also known as the Cabot Trail.

See also
List of Nova Scotia provincial highways

References

Nova Scotia provincial highways
Roads in Shelburne County, Nova Scotia